Daniel Richard Knott (20 June 1918 – 11 June 2014) was an Australian rules footballer who played with Collingwood and Richmond in the Victorian Football League (VFL).

His brothers were also successful sportsmen, Arch also played in the VFL, for Fitzroy and St Kilda and George represented Australia at the 1948 London Olympic Games before becoming Mayor of Collingwood.

Notes

External links 

1918 births
Australian rules footballers from Victoria (Australia)
Collingwood Football Club players
Richmond Football Club players
2014 deaths